Christopher Lionel John Loder (born 5 September 1981) is a British Conservative Party politician who has been the MP for West Dorset since the 2019 general election. He succeeded Sir Oliver Letwin, who was elected as a Conservative but sat as an independent after having the whip removed in September 2019 and did not stand for reelection. West Dorset can be considered a safe seat, having only ever elected Conservative MPs.

Early life
Loder was born in Sherborne in September 1981. He grew up near Folke in Dorset on his parents' farm and attended The Gryphon School in Sherborne. Aged 18, he joined South West Trains as a train guard. He stayed in the rail industry, rising to becoming head of new trains for South Western Railway, until his election to Parliament in 2019.

Political career
Loder became parish clerk for Bishops Caundle in 1998, and was awarded the young person's merit award for commitment to the local community. 
He was elected to West Dorset District Council to represent the ward of Cam Vale in a 2013 by-election. The district was subject to a boundary review and Loder was not re-elected in 2015 when the seat became a two-member ward. Loder was chairman of West Dorset Conservatives for more than three years until August 2019.

He is a member of the Common Sense Group which represents the socially conservative wing of the Conservative Party. Following an interim report on the connections between colonialism and properties now in the care of the National Trust, including links with historic slavery, Loder was among the signatories of a letter to The Daily Telegraph in November 2020 from the Common Sense Group. The letter accused the National Trust of being "coloured by cultural Marxist dogma, colloquially known as the 'woke agenda'".

Personal life
One of Loder's hobbies is bell ringing at local churches in Dorset.

References

External links

1981 births
Living people
Conservative Party (UK) councillors
Conservative Party (UK) MPs for English constituencies
UK MPs 2019–present